Újpesti TE is a sport society in Újpest, Hungary. It may also refer to:

 Újpesti TE (canoeing) - canoeing/kayaking club
 Újpesti TE (fencing) - fencing club
 Újpesti TE (ice hockey) - ice hockey club
 Újpesti TE (waterpolo) - water polo club

See also
 Újpest FC - football club